Sericosura heteroscela is a species of sea spider within the family Ammotheidae. The species is found in the Atlantic Ocean, where it lives near hydrothermal vents at depths of 849 to 3500 meters.

References 

Animals described in 1996
Pycnogonids
Fauna of the Atlantic Ocean